Hemlock Falls is a waterfall located in Rabun County, Georgia.

Hemlock Falls may also refer to:

 Hemlock Falls (Cloudland Canyon), Georgia
 Hemlock Falls (Oregon)
 A waterfall in South Mountain Reservation, New Jersey
 Several waterfalls in Nova Scotia
 A mystery series by Mary Stanton